Edward Carey may refer to:

Edward Carey (businessman) (1832–1908), Canadian businessman and politician.
Edward Carey (novelist) (born 1970), English playwright, and novelist
Edward L. Carey (1805–1845), American publisher and aesthete
Edward M. Carey (1916–2002), American oil industry executive
Edward P. Carey, known as Ned Carey, American politician
Edward Carey (MP), English Member of Parliament for Scarborough
Edward Macdonald Carey (1913–1994), American actor
Eddie Carey (born 1960), American sprinter
Edward Cary (died 1618), English courtier